The 2021–22 NCAA Division I women's ice hockey season began in September 2021 and ended with the 2022 NCAA National Collegiate Women's Ice Hockey Tournament's championship game at Pegula Ice Arena in State College, Pennsylvania on March 20, 2022.

Polls

Regular season

Realignment
In 2019 the Minnesota Intercollegiate Athletic Conference, an NCAA Division III league, took the unprecedented step of removing St. Thomas from its membership because of concerns about "athletic competitive parity." Because the removal affected all sports and was effective at the end of the 2020–21 season, St. Thomas had time to decide what it would do next. The women's ice hockey program was given the green light to jump directly to the Division I level in July 2020. The women's hockey team joined the WCHA for the 2021–22 season.

On May 26, 2021, Robert Morris announced that it was dropping both men's and women's hockey effective immediately.

Standings

Player stats

Scoring leaders
The following players lead the NCAA in points at the conclusion of games played on March 20, 2022.

Leading goaltenders
The following goaltenders lead the NCAA in goals against average.
GP = Games played; Min = Minutes played; W = Wins; L = Losses; T = Ties; GA = Goals against; SO = Shutouts; SV% = Save percentage; GAA = Goals against average

NCAA tournament

References

2021–22 NCAA Division I women's hockey season
NCAA
NCAA Division I women's ice hockey seasons